Rae St. Clair Bridgman, a Canadian anthropologist, author and artist, writes and illustrates picture books for young children and is the author/illustrator of The MiddleGate Books, a series of fantasy books for children inspired by the Narcisse Snake Pits of Narcisse, Manitoba -- The Serpent’s Spell (McNally Robinson Book for Young People finalist 2006), Amber Ambrosia, Fish and Sphinx (Speculative Literature Foundation Honourable Mention 2008) and Kingdom of Trolls (Moonbeam Children's Books Award 2011). The books feature the adventures of young cousins Wil and Sophie who live in the secret, magical city of MiddleGate, beset by the return of an ancient secret society known as the Serpent's Chain.

Bridgman is also the author of Angel - Homeless in Toronto (2016), Jimmy Tattoo - Homeless on the Streets of Toronto (2016), StreetCities: Rehousing the Homeless (Broadview Press, 2006) and Safe Haven: The Story of a Shelter for Homeless Women (University of Toronto Press, 2003), co-author of Braving the Street: The Anthropology of Homelessness (Berghahn Books, 1999) and co-editor of ''Feminist Fields: Ethnographic Insights (Broadview Press, 1999).

Background
Rae Bridgman was born in Toronto, and now lives in Winnipeg, Manitoba. Bridgman received her Bachelor of Arts degree (Classics) and her Bachelor of Music from the University of Toronto, and her Master's (Interdisciplinary Studies) and PhD (Anthropology) from York University. She holds the position of Professor in the Department of City Planning at the University of Manitoba in the Faculty of Architecture, and is co-director of BridgmanCollaborative Architecture, a Winnipeg architectural firm. Her work spans children's picture books, fantasy novels and scholarly books. She also plays the tuba in Classy Brass, an amateur women's brass quintet.

Bridgman illustrates her fantasy novels with distinctive pen-and-ink and pan pastel drawings. Her books are also unique for their word-play and use of Latin as a magical language.

Works
Non-fiction:
Feminist Fields: Ethnographic Insights (co-editors Sally Cole and Heather Howard-Bobiwash). Broadview Press; 1-551111-195-0; 1999. Edited collection.
Braving the Street: The Anthropology of Homelessness. Co-author Irene Glasser. Berghahn Books; 1-57181-097-8; 1999. Academic.
I Helped Build That: A Demonstration Employment Training Program for Homeless Youth in Toronto, Canada. American Anthropologist. Academic. 2001
Safe Haven: The Story of a Shelter for Homeless Women. University of Toronto Press. Academic. 2003
StreetCities: Rehousing the Homeless. Broadview Press. Academic. 2006

Fiction:
The Serpent's Spell. Great Plains Publications, 2006
Amber Ambrosia. Second of the MiddleGate books, Great Plains Publications, 2007
Fish and Sphinx. The third of the MiddleGate Books, Great Plains Publications, 2008
Kingdom of Trolls. The fourth of the MiddleGate Books, Sybertooth, 2011
Angel - Homeless in Toronto. 2016
Jimmy Tattoo - Homeless on the Streets of Toronto. 2016

References

External links
 
 BridgmanCollaborative Architecture
 Rae St. Clair Bridgman, professor at the University of Manitoba
 Classy Brass, a Canadian women's amateur brass quintet
 
 

Year of birth missing (living people)
Living people
Canadian children's writers
Canadian fantasy writers
Canadian anthropologists
Canadian women anthropologists
21st-century Canadian women writers
University of Toronto alumni
York University alumni
Canadian illustrators
Canadian women illustrators